is an arcade-style combat flight simulation video game developed and published by Namco for the PlayStation. The third game in the Ace Combat franchise, it was released in Japan in 1999 and in Europe and North America in 2000. Players control an aircraft and must complete various mission objectives, such as destroying squadrons of enemies or protecting a base from enemy fire.

Namco directors Takuya Iwasaki and Atsushi Shiozawa designed Electrosphere to be visually distinct from other combat flight simulators, using Ace Combat 2 as a base for the game's ideas and mechanics. The storyline was designed to be a core aspect of the game, and to serve a proper purpose by directly affecting the gameplay. Electrosphere carries a more futuristic science fiction-inspired landscape and world compared to the modern-day theme of its predecessors. The game is infamous for its drastic differences in content in the Japanese and international releases; Namco intended to retain the Japanese version's two-disc campaign and larger story, but due to financial constraints the game was cut down for North America and Europe.

Though it had a small marketing campaign and little promotion, Electrosphere shipped over one million copies. The Japanese release received positive reviews and was seen as ambitious in its design. International releases were more mixed, with critics expressing confusion towards the lack of content and bland gameplay. In retrospect, Electrosphere has been well-received, with critics identifying and appreciating its ambition, story, and changes to the gameplay of the series.

Gameplay

Ace Combat 3: Electrosphere is a combat flight simulation video game. Like its predecessors, it is presented in a more arcade-like format in contrast to other flight sim video games. Players pilot one of 23 different aircraft across four separate factions and must complete a selection of the game's 52 missions depending on their faction. These missions range from destroying squadrons of enemies to protecting a base from enemy fire. Player performance is graded from an A to D letter scale, which are logged in a chart on the title screen.

Electrosphere adds several new mechanics to the core Ace Combat gameplay. One of these is the ability to fly spacecraft, with one mission taking place above Earth in outer space. Players can watch instant replays of their best kills at the end of each mission. A limited number of planes and weapons can be selected for the first few missions, but only one can be used for the remaining half of the game. Missions also contain radio chatter from both the player's faction and opposing ones. The player can rotate their camera 360-degrees around their fighter in order to see what is behind them or get a better view of the level.

The Japanese version of the game features additional content that is not present in the international releases. The most notable of these are the branching stage paths; depending on actions made by player input at certain sections of the game, the plot will change based on the outcome of those decision, leading to one of five possible endings. An in-game encyclopedia can be accessed, documenting information regarding the game's characters and technology. Anime-style video emails with voice overs can be accessed, played through a fictional email inbox. Obtaining all five endings will unlock Mission Simulator mode, which allows the player to replay any mission with any aircraft and weapon of their choice.

Plot
Ace Combat 3 is set within the United Galaxy Space Force saga, a fictional universe by Namco that connects many of their space-related games into a cohesive timeline. It takes place in a world where government and rule of law have been superseded by sheer economic power and multinational corporations. The largest of these are Neucom Incorporated and General Resource Limited, fierce rivals that have competed against each other for power for many years. Despite efforts of peace-making by the Universal Peace Enforcement Organization (UPEO), war eventually breaks out when Neucom launches large-scale strikes against General Resource, forcing the UPEO to deploy a series of fighters to end the rivalry between the two companies and put an end to the war.

Development

Ace Combat 3: Electrosphere began development in 1998 following the critical and commercial success of Air Combat and Ace Combat 2. Directors Takuya Iwasaki and Atsushi and producer Takashi Fukawa led a team of other Namco employees during production, most of whom had worked on Ace Combat 2. The directors wanted the third entry to be far more ambitious than its predecessors in both content and presentation. The team focused primarily on making the storyline a key mechanic, which would change and affect the gameplay based on player progress and decision. Storylines in previous Ace Combat games were seen as unimportant and did not have a direct effect on the gameplay itself; this decision was to help make the story feel like an integral part of the game and to serve an actual purpose. Drama television shows and the game R4: Ridge Racer Type 4 (1998) served as inspiration for this idea.

During development, the team worked to make Electrosphere visually distinct from other combat flight simulators and create new technological breakthroughs. This led to the game's futuristic, science fiction setting and world, which was created through combining 1970s city designs and modern-day architecture. The developers used Ace Combat 2 as a basis for the game, leading to Electrosphere borrowing many of its ideas and concepts. Hardware limitations of the PlayStation and the team's limited skills made them skeptical of their vision and world being implemented. The console had difficulties rendering maps due to their size, which made the game difficult to program. Programmer Kenji Nakano created a workaround to this problem by rendering far-away objects with far fewer polygons than they were up-close, which took two months to implement. Cutscene animations were provided by Production I.G, featuring dark shadows and contrasting lines. To give the game the illusion of time passing, a day-to-night cycle was implemented. Graphic designer Minoru Sashida, who worked on the arcade game Techno Drive, designed the game's menu interface.

Release
Namco announced Ace Combat 3: Electrosphere in August 1998. The company remained quiet about the game, making minimal comments during that year's Tokyo Game Show. The company broke the silence in November, opening up a website and showing conceptual artwork to video game publications. Only a single level and a select few aircraft were revealed. Namco announced it was slated for a release in the first half of 1999 in Japan. A small sample of video footage from the game was presented in a bonus disc shipped out with the Japanese release of Ridge Racer Type 4. Famitsu reported that the game was roughly 80% complete by January 1999. After months of secrecy, Namco demonstrated Electrosphere at the 1999 Tokyo Game Show, presented alongside World Stadium 3, Dragon Valor, and the Dreamcast conversion of Soulcalibur, taking up most of the Namco's booth. Ace Combat 3: Electrosphere was published on May 27, 1999 in Japan by Namco Inc.. Its size forced it to be split across two discs, each containing 26 missions for a total of 52 different missions. Alongside a 26-page instruction manual, it contained a 30-page promotional booklet called the Ace Combat 3 Electrosphere - Portfolio Photosphere, which details the game's characters, aircraft, storyline, and other information regarding its fictional world. On December 7, 2000, it was re-released in Japan under the PlayStation the Best line of budget titles.

For the North American release, Namco Hometek Inc. removed all characters and considerably altered the original story-line, keeping only the inter-corporate conflict intact. Electrosphere was released in Europe on January 21, 2000, and in North America on March 3.

Localization 
Frognation, a Japanese dubbing company, was contracted to assist in production of the localization process. Frognation contacted Agness Kaku, a translator known for her work on games such as Metal Gear Solid 2: Sons of Liberty and D2, to help translate the game. She recalled doing a demo translation based on the original Japanese storyline, but because of funding being cut Namco America scrapped the translation entirely and chose to completely re-do the plot for overseas audiences; this included removing the multiple endings, branching story paths, and almost half of the missions. It was also slightly altered to fit onto a single disc. While an official reason was not given for the cut of funds, Kaku believes it was due to the game not selling as well as Namco hoped in Japan, which gave the American division little hope in it being successful either.

Namco presented the game at the 1999 Electronic Entertainment Expo (E3) exposition to mostly positive coverage. Before the funding was cut for the translation, Namco had already begun advertising the game's interconnected storyline. According to Kaku, when Namco stated that the American release would be heavily cut down and omit the original Japanese storyline, it was met with backlash from fans and publications, causing interest in the game to severely diminish when it was ready to ship.

A text-only fan translation covering most of one of the game's five routes was uploaded to GameFAQS in June 2000. Work on a text-only English fan-translation for all 52 missions began in 2009, reaching completion in 2010. In December 2016, the team published patches that translated the game's story.

Reception

Commercially, Ace Combat 3: Electrosphere under-performed, and was not as big of a hit as Namco hoped it would be. It was commercially unsuccessful in North America and pulled fewer units than previous entries. It holds a 74% on the video game review aggregator website GameRankings. By 2008, Electrosphere had shipped 1.164 million copies worldwide, barely surpassing Ace Combat 2s 1.092 million worldwide shipment.

The Japanese version of Electrosphere received mostly positive reviews. Staff from Famitsu appreciated the game for its "overwhelming" graphics and deeper storyline, in addition to its realism. An Official Czech PlayStation Magazine reviewer had a similar response, enjoying its futuristic approach, realistic graphics, and refined gameplay. In an early preview, James Mielke of GameSpot commented that, while it was not as fun as Ace Combat 2, had the same ambitious design as R4: Ridge Racer Type 4, with personality-driven cutscenes, sleek fighter craft designs, and detailed graphics. Edge staff members highlighted its branching storyline, stating that it makes the game more involving and rewarding than its predecessors.

By a drastic comparison, reviews for the North American and European releases were met with a much more mixed response. Because international versions had a significantly lower amount of content than in the Japanese version, reviewers showed confusion and disappointment towards the lack of missions and a proper storyline for diminishing the game as a whole. Mielke presented a radically different response to Electrosphere from his preview, writing that its removal of content from the Japanese version and linear approach made the game feel inferior to its predecessor Ace Combat 2. Next Generations Eric Bratcher agreed that without its branching level system and additional campaign, it felt boring to play and not nearly as refined as earlier Ace Combat games. Mandip Sandhu of Electric Playground showed disappointment towards the plot and bland cutscenes for creating a story that had little to no significance over the game itself. Staff for the Official UK PlayStation Magazine said that it felt more like a PC flight simulator than an Ace Combat game, mockingly writing: "Namco prove that yes, it is possible to recreate PC-style flight sim graphics on the PlayStation. But, unfortunately, they forgot to include a game to go with them". Not all reviewers expressed criticism over the game; Sam Bishop of IGN and a writer for GamePro both praised the gameplay for being solid and energetic, with Bishop in particular commenting that it "delivers the same action-packed air combat experience that you've come to expect from the series, and does it with an unmatched style and flair that's never over the top". Jeuxvideo.coms Kornifex said that it had the same refinement as Ace Combat 2, with a large selection of fighters and varied missions.

Critics agreed that Electrosphere posed "gorgeous" graphics with plenty of detail. Bishop said it had an amazing sense of detail and proved to be one of the game's strong points. GamePro and Mielke both agreed, with GamePro in particular saying that it had a unique blend of realistic and arcade-esque graphics. Mielke also liked the game's high production values. Electric Playground complemented its visuals for their high amount of detail, as did Jeuxvideo.com and Official UK PlayStation Magazine. Reviewers also praised the game's control scheme for being responsive and easy to use, with GamePro specifically pointing out its realism to actual aircraft. Kornifex also praised the game's usage of the PlayStation DualShock controller to great effect, namely with its rumble feature and smoothness. Electrospheres soundtrack, usage of instant replays, and considerable lack of slowdown were also the subject of praise. While Next Generation praised the graphical style and gameplay mechanics, they felt it ultimately fell short compared to its predecessors, writing: "Ace Combat 3 has too many arcade elements to be a serious flight sim. Unfortunately, it's also too boring to be a great arcade-style dogfighter".

Retrospective feedback
Ace Combat 3 has received better feedback in retrospect, with critics identifying its ambitious design and story. In celebration of the game's 20th anniversary in 2019, Game*Spark retrospectively compared the complex storyline of Electrosphere to that of Final Fantasy VII and Ridge Racer Type 4, praising its branching path system for having a meaningful, interesting impact on the plot as a whole. They also liked the game's futuristic atmosphere and theme, a drastic departure from other Ace Combat games. Game*Spark further stated that Electrosphere was one of the best and most unique games in the series, showing disappointment towards the lack of a modern digital release on platforms such as PlayStation Network.

Sebastiano Pezzile, a writer for Player.it, reviewed the game in 2019 to commemorate the launch of Ace Combat 7: Skies Unknown. They compared its story and visual style to that of Neon Genesis Evangelion and Ghost in the Shell, enjoying its larger storyline for being far darker than its predecessors. While they praised its Wipeout-influenced soundtrack, Player.it was critical of the international version for being inferior to Air Combat and Ace Combat 2 from a content standpoint. Writing for GameRevolution, Tyler Treese also expressed their disappointment in the game's international release, believing it made for one of the worst attempts at video game localization.

Notes

References

External links
Official website 

1999 video games
Ace Combat
PlayStation (console) games
PlayStation (console)-only games
Combat flight simulators
Production I.G
Fiction set in 2040
Science fiction shooter video games
Video games set in the 2040s
Single-player video games
Video games developed in Japan
Video games scored by Go Shiina
Video games with alternate endings